The 1950–51 National Football League was the 20th staging of the National Football League, an annual Gaelic football tournament for the Gaelic Athletic Association county teams of Ireland.

Thirty counties participated; Kilkenny and Limerick did not participate.

Meath won the home final and flew to New York for the real final. Despite some players being weakened by smallpox vaccination, they beat New York by a goal and sailed home in triumph on the SS Nieuw Amsterdam. John 'Lefty' Devine commentated on the radio, and was criticised for his newly acquired New York accent (he was a native of County Clare).

Format 
Teams are placed into Divisions I, II, III and IV. The top team in each division reaches the home semi-finals. The winner of the home final plays  in the NFL final.

Group stage

Division I (Dr Lagan Cup)

Eastern Section

Western Section

Division II

Division III

Division IV

Division V

Knockout stage

Quarter-finals

Semi-finals

Finals

References

National Football League
National Football League
National Football League (Ireland) seasons